Ryan Todd McClure (born February 16, 1977) is a former American football center who spent his entire 13-year career playing with the Atlanta Falcons in the National Football League (NFL). He was drafted by the Falcons in the seventh round of the 1999 NFL Draft. He played college football at LSU.

College career
He played tight end at Central High School in Central, Louisiana. McClure played his college football for the LSU Tigers. He was initially going to be redshirted before an injury to starter Marcus Carmouche inserted him into the starting lineup. As a senior and junior he was a consensus All-Southeastern Conference first-team choice.

Professional career
McClure was drafted by the Atlanta Falcons in the seventh round of the 1999 NFL Draft. During training camp of his rookie season he suffered a torn anterior cruciate ligament in his right knee and missed his entire rookie season. During his second season he took over as the Falcons starting center after Calvin Collins was moved to guard. Since then he missed only one game and was the Falcons starting center from 2000 until his retirement after the 2012 season.

McClure made the first start of his career at center against the Carolina Panthers on October 29. During the 2004 postseason, McClure was part of a line that set the fourth-highest NFL postseason record with 327 rushing yards, including a Falcons record 142 yards by Warrick Dunn and an NFL record for quarterbacks with Michael Vick collecting 119 yards on the ground.

McClure retired on March 13, 2013, and during his retirement press conference Falcons owner Arthur Blank stated that McClure would soon join the Atlanta Falcons Ring of Honor.

In July 2022, it was announced that McClure will be inducted into the team’s Ring of Honor in October.  On October 30, 2022 he was inducted during a home game against the Carolina Panthers.

References

External links
Atlanta Falcons bio

1977 births
Living people
American football centers
Atlanta Falcons players
LSU Tigers football players
Players of American football from Baton Rouge, Louisiana